Tristan Corbière (18 July 1845 – 1 March 1875), born Édouard-Joachim Corbière,  was a French poet born in Coat-Congar, Ploujean (now part of Morlaix) in Brittany, where he lived most of his life before dying of tuberculosis at the age of 29. He was a French poet, close to Symbolism, and a figure of the "cursed poet". 

He is the author of a single collection of poetry Les Amours Jaunes, and of a few prose pieces. He led a mostly marginal and miserable life, nourished by two major failures due to his bone disease and his "ugliness" which he enjoyed accusing: the first is his sentimental life (he only loved one woman, called "Marcelle" in his work), and the second being his passion for the sea (he dreamt of becoming a sailor, like his father, Édouard Corbière). His poetry carries these two great wounds which led him to adopt a very cynical and incisive style, towards himself as much towards the life and world around him.

He died at the age of 29, possibly from tuberculosis, a childless bachelor with no work, entrenched in his old Breton manor, misunderstood by his contemporaries, and his innovative poetry was not recognised until well after his death.

Family and schooling

His mother Marie-Angélique-Aspasie Puyo, 19 years old at the time of his birth, belonged to one of the most prominent families of the local bourgeoisie. His father was Antoine-Édouard Corbière, known for his best-selling novel Le Négrier.  A cousin, Constant Puyo, was a well-known Pictorialist photographer.

During his schooling at the Imperial Lycée of Saint-Brieuc where he studied from 1858 until 1860, he fell prey to a deep depression, and, over several freezing winters,  contracted the severe rheumatism which was to disfigure him. He blamed his parents for having placed him there, far from his family's care and affection. Difficulties in adapting to the harsh discipline of the college's noble débris (distinguished relics, i.e., teachers) gradually developed those characteristics of anarchic disdain and sarcasm which were to give much of his verse their distinctive voice.

Poetry
Corbière's only published verse in his lifetime appeared in Les amours jaunes, 1873, a volume that went almost unnoticed until Paul Verlaine included him in his gallery of poètes maudits (accursed poets).  Thereafter Verlaine's recommendation was enough to establish him as one of the masters acknowledged by the Symbolists, and he was subsequently rediscovered and treated as a predecessor by the surrealists.

Close-packed, linked to the ocean and his Breton roots, and tinged with disdain for Romantic sentimentalism, his work is also characterised by its idiomatic play and exceptional modernity. He was praised by both Ezra Pound and T. S. Eliot (whose work he had a great influence on).

Eliot used his self-description as "Mélange adultère de tout" as the title for one of his own (French) poems. Many subsequent modernist poets have also studied him, and he has often been translated into English. 

His complete poems appear in two volumes with translations by the English poet Christopher Pilling.

See also
Charles Baudelaire
Orientalism

References

External links

1845 births
1875 deaths
19th-century French poets
19th-century French male writers
19th-century deaths from tuberculosis
Writers from Brittany
Tuberculosis deaths in France
French male poets
People from Morlaix
Poètes maudits

Content in this edit is translated from the existing French Wikipedia article at :fr:Tristan Corbière; see its history for attribution.